The literature of North Carolina, USA, includes fiction, poetry, and varieties of nonfiction. Representative authors include playwright Paul Green, short-story writer O. Henry, and novelist Thomas Wolfe.

History
 See Scottish Gaelic literature, Iain mac Mhurchaidh
A printing press began operating in New Bern, at the time North Carolina's capital, in 1749.

"The first book published by a black in the South was The Hope of Liberty (1829), which contained poems decrying the slaves' condition, by George Moses Horton of North Carolina." Harriet Jacobs (1813–1897) "details events of slave life in Edenton" in her 1861 autobiographical Incidents in the Life of a Slave Girl.

Organizations
The North Carolina Literary and Historical Association began in 1900 in Raleigh, and the North Carolina Poetry Society  in 1932 in Charlotte. The North Carolina Writers' Network formed in 1985, and the Winston-Salem Writers group in 2005.

North Carolina Literary Hall of Fame
The "North Carolina Literary Hall of Fame" (est.1996) resides in the James Boyd House in the town of Southern Pines. Inductees:

 Anthony S. Abbott (2020) 
 A.R. Ammons
 Allan Gurganus
 Bernice Kelly Harris
 Betty Adcock
 Bland Simpson
 Burke Davis
 Carl Sandburg
 Carole Boston Weatherford
 Charles Chesnutt
 Charles Frazier
 Christian Reid
 Clyde Edgerton
 Doris Betts
 Elizabeth Daniels Squire
 Elizabeth Spencer
 Frances Gray Patton
 Fred Chappell
 George Moses Horton
 Gerald Barrax
 Gerald Johnson
 Glen Rounds
 Guy Owen
 Harriet Jacobs

 Helen Bevington
 Inglis Fletcher
 Jaki Shelton Green
 James Applewhite
 James Boyd
 James W. Clark Jr.
 James Ephraim McGirt
 Jill McCorkle
 John Charles McNeill
 John Ehle
 John Hope Franklin
 John Lawson
 Jonathan Williams
 Jonathan Worth Daniels
 Joseph Mitchell
 Kathryn Stripling Byer
 Lee Smith
 Louis D. Rubin, Jr.
 Manly Wade Wellman
 Margaret Maron
 Marsha White Warren
 Max Steele
 Maya Angelou
 Olive Tilford Dargan

 Paul Green
 Pauli Murray
 Penelope Niven
 Randall Jarrell
 Randall Kenan
 Reynolds Price
 Richard Walser
 Robert Morgan
 Robert Ruark
 Ronald H. Bayes
 Sam Ragan
 Samm-Art Williams
 Shelby Stephenson
 Thad Stem, Jr.
 Thomas Wolfe
 Tom Wicker
 Walter Hines Page
 Wilbur J. Cash
 William LeGette Blythe
 William S. Powell
 William Sydney Porter, known as O. Henry
 Wilma Dykeman

Awards and events
In 1948 Arthur Talmage Abernethy became the first North Carolina Poet Laureate.

See also
 :Category:Writers from North Carolina
 List of newspapers in North Carolina
 :Category:North Carolina in fiction
 :Category:Libraries in North Carolina
 Southern United States literature
 American literary regionalism

References

Bibliography

  
 . (Works by North Carolinans or related to the state)
 
 
  (Includes information about North Carolina literature)
 
 . (Includes examples of work by Charles W. Chesnutt, Anna J. Cooper, George Moses Horton, Harriet Ann Jacobs, Moses Roper, David Walker)

External links
 
  (Directory ceased in 2017)
 

American literature by state
literature